Stuart Dickinson (born 19 July 1968) is an Australian former Rugby union referee. Dickinson has refereed in many rugby competitions, including the Rugby World Cup, Tri Nations, Six Nations, international friendlies, Super 12/14/15, and Shute Shield.
He was a referee at the 1999 Rugby World Cup, the 2003 Rugby World Cup, and the 2007 Rugby World Cup. He is Australia's most-capped referee, and the only Australian referee to appear at three Rugby World Cups.

Referee career
Dickinson commenced refereeing at the age of 12 while also playing fly-half and fullback for Epping Boys' High School. He was employed full-time with the Australian Rugby Union (ARU) from 1996 to 2011. Prior to 1996, he worked as a site manager for Linfox, a transport company as well as with the New South Wales Police Force.

He made his international refereeing debut in 1997 in a Rugby World Cup qualifier between Tahiti and Papua New Guinea. He refereed his first international match between two Tier 1 nations a year later for the 1998 international between Wales and South Africa at Wembley.

Dickinson refereed several pool games in the 2007 Rugby World Cup, including Fiji's upset of Wales. Shortly after the 2007 World Cup, Dickinson authored a book entitled "The Rugby World Cup Diaries – A referee's inside view."

Dickinson was publicly criticised by IRB referees manager Paddy O'Brien for his refereeing of the scrums in the Italy v New Zealand Test Match at the San Siro Stadium in Milan on 14 November 2009. O'Brien stated that Dickinson had got it "completely wrong", believing the Italian tight-head prop, Martin Castrogiovanni was boring in on his opposite. This led to outrage by the Australian Rugby Union, who issued a formal complaint to the IRB against Paddy O'Brien. O'Brien ended up apologising to Stuart Dickinson and the Australian Rugby Union:  "I have unreservedly apologised to Stuart Dickinson for the action of publicly discussing elements of his performance review and would like to extend that apology to the Australian Rugby Union," said O'Brien.

Retirement
In 2010 despite being rated in the Top 3 SANZAR Referees (after being appointed to the Super Rugby semi-final in Soweto) he was overlooked for the 6 Nations tournament for the first time since 2000. Then in 2011 Dickinson was overlooked for the Rugby World Cup. O'Brien denied there was any vendetta against Dickinson. Dickinson subsequently announced his retirement from refereeing on 27 September 2011.

Test Match Honour Roll
At the Townsville District Rugby Union Referees Dinner on 2 October 2009, Dickinson confirmed (at that time) he had refereed 43 international matches in total.  41 of those matches are listed below.

1997  Papua New Guinea v Tahiti 
1997  Tonga v Cook Islands 
1998  Canada v Argentina 
1998  Hong Kong v South Korea 
1998  Wales v South Africa 
1999  New Zealand v France 
1999  Scotland v Uruguay  (World Cup)
1999  Argentina v Japan  (World Cup)
1999  Ireland v Argentina  (World Cup)
2000  France v England 
2000  South Africa v England 
2000  Wales v Samoa 
2001  France v Scotland 
2001  England v Italy 
2001  New Zealand Maoris v Argentina 
2001  England v South Africa 
2002  Japan v South Korea 
2002  Chinese Taipei v South Korea 
2002  Fiji v Tonga 
2002  New Zealand v South Africa 
2002  Wales v Fiji 
2003  New Zealand v England 
2003  Scotland v Japan  (World Cup)
2003  South Africa v Georgia  (World Cup)
2004  Wales v France 
2004  New Zealand v Pacific Islanders
2005 British and Irish Lions v Argentina 
2005  England v Barbarians
2005  Wales v South Africa 
2006  Ireland v Scotland 
2006  New Zealand v Ireland 
2006  South Africa v France 
2006  France v New Zealand 
2007  New Zealand v France 
2007  New Zealand v South Africa 
2007  USA v Tonga  (World Cup)
2007  Argentina v Namibia  (World Cup)
2007  Wales v Fiji  (World Cup)
2008  Ireland v England 
2008  New Zealand v South Africa 
2008  New Zealand v Samoa 
2008  Wales v Canada 
2009  England v France 
2009  South Africa v British and Irish Lions
2009  Italy v New Zealand 
2010  Argentina v France 
 2011 New Zealand vs Fiji

2010 Super 14 season
Round 1, 12 February 2010: Hurricanes 34 – 20 Blues
Round 7, 26 March 2010: Highlanders 39 – 29 Lions
Round 8, 2 April 2010: Western Force 16 – 15 Stormers
Round 9, 10 April 2010: Blues 21 – 33 Stormers
Round 12, 30 April 2010: Stormers 42 – 14 Crusaders
Round 13, 8 May 2010: Sharks 20 – 14 Stormers
Semi-Final, 22 May 2010: Bulls 39 – 24 Crusaders

References

External links
 Stuart Dickinson on rwc2003.irb.com
 Rugby World Cup 2007 match official appointments set IRB.com
"Boks blame Dickinson" – Tri-Nations 2007 refereeing controversy sport.iafrica.com

1968 births
Living people
People educated at Epping Boys High School
Australian rugby union referees
Rugby World Cup referees
Super Rugby referees
The Rugby Championship referees
Six Nations Championship referees
ARU referees